Without Love is the second studio album by the American glam metal band Black 'n Blue. It was produced by Bruce Fairbairn. The album features a guest appearance by Loverboy's Mike Reno on the song, "We Got the Fire".

Track listing
Side one
 "Rockin' on Heaven's Door" (Jaime St. James, Tommy Thayer) – 3:30
 "Without Love" (St. James, Jim Vallance) – 3:38
 "Stop the Lightning" (St. James, Thayer) – 4:08
 "Nature of the Beach" (St. James, Thayer) – 3:50
 "Miss Mystery" (St. James, Thayer, Vallance) – 4:00

Side two
"Swing Time" (St. James, Jeff Warner) – 3:21
 "Bombastic Plastic" (St. James) – 3:38
 "We Got the Fire" (St. James, Thayer, Warner) – 3:11
 "Strange Things" (St. James, Thayer, Warner) – 3:24
 "Two Wrongs (Don't Make It Love)" (St. James, Thayer) – 3:51

CD edition bonus track
"Same Old Song and Dance" (Joe Perry, Steven Tyler) – 4:14 (Aerosmith cover)

Personnel
Black 'n Blue
 Jaime St. James – lead and backing vocals
 Tommy Thayer – lead guitar, backing vocals
 Jeff Warner – rhythm guitar
 Patrick Young – bass
 Pete Holmes – drums

Additional musicians
Jim Vallance – electronic drums
Adam Bomb – additional guitar
Dave Pickell, Doug Johnson, Steve Porcaro – keyboards
Mike Reno – backing vocals on "We Got the Fire"

Production
Bruce Fairbairn – producer, mixing
Bob Rock – engineer, mixing
Mike Fraser, Rob Porter – additional engineers
George Marino – mastering

References

Black 'n Blue albums
1985 albums
Albums produced by Bruce Fairbairn
Geffen Records albums
Albums recorded at Little Mountain Sound Studios